Wade Marcus was a music producer and arranger associated with the Motown sound during the 1970s. He composed the music to the film The Final Comedown with Grant Green. He also produced albums by The Blackbyrds, Gary Bartz, A Taste of Honey, The Sylvers, Eddie Kendricks, The Dramatics, Peaches & Herb, Donald Byrd, G. C. Cameron, Stevie Wonder and The Emotions.

Discography

As leader
A New Era (1971, Cotillion Records)
Metamorphosis (1976, Impulse! Records)

As Arranger
With Brass Fever
Brass Fever (Impulse!, 1975) 
With Ron Carter
Parade (Milestone, 1979)
Super Strings (Milestone, 1981)
With Bo Diddley
Big Bad Bo (Chess, 1974)
With Ronnie Foster
Two Headed Freap (Blue Note, 1972)
With Grant Green
Shades of Green (Blue Note, 1971) 
The Final Comedown (Blue Note, 1972)
With Bobbi Humphrey
Flute In (Blue Note, 1971)
Dig This! (Blue Note, 1972)
With Blue Mitchell
Stratosonic Nuances (RCA, 1975)
With Marlena Shaw
Marlena (Blue Note, 1972)
From the Depths of My Soul (Blue Note, 1973)
With Sonny Stitt
Satan (Cadet, 1974)
With Stanley Turrentine
Everybody Come On Out (Fantasy, 1976)
With Reuben Wilson
Set Us Free (Blue Note, 1971)

References

Place of birth missing (living people)
Year of birth missing (living people)
Living people
American record producers
Impulse! Records artists
American jazz musicians
American male conductors (music)
American music arrangers
21st-century American conductors (music)
21st-century American male musicians
American male jazz musicians
Brass Fever members